Daniel Anthony O'Donohue (October 27, 1931 – May 16, 2019) was an American diplomat who served as United States Ambassador to Burma from November 1983 to December 1986, and to Thailand from July 11, 1988 to August 10, 1991. He was a career foreign service officer.

References

External links
  
 List of U.S. Ambassadors to Thailand 1882 to present (with picture.)

1931 births
2019 deaths
Ambassadors of the United States to Myanmar
Ambassadors of the United States to Thailand
United States Foreign Service personnel
People from Detroit